Iran Aircraft Industries (IACI) or SAHA (صها abbreviated of صنایع هواپیمایی ایران) was established in 1961 mainly for major repair of fighter, passenger, and air support planes. Over time, SAHA became an important part of Iran’s aviation industry. In 1998, Iranian scientists and experts started designing, engineering, and manufacturing complex engine parts, airplane parts, and manufacturing turbine engines like Toloue-4.
 
SAHA is currently working on turbo prop engines called TV-3 for IrAn-140 planes.

Accomplishments:
 Production of 100% Iranian made turbofan jet engine MD-80 class in 2014, comparable to JT8D-219 jet engine
 Mass production of Toloue-4 mini jet engine 
 Capability to repair aircraft like Boeing 747
 Owj (Zenith) engine, GE J85, J79
 Jahesh-700 (Leap) 7 kN 1574 lbf turbofan turbojet
 Repairing Dart engines
 Building repair lines to repair heavy engines like Astazo (Turbomeca Astazou), F, and Solar.
 TV3S, AL- , RD33 93, AI D- MS, D30

See also
Iran Aviation Industries Organization
Iranian Military Industry
Airlines of Iran

References

External links
Overhaul Iran Air Boeing 747 - YouTube Video 
 Iran 7th Kish Air show Iranian manufactured turbofan engine JT8D-219 - YouTube Video

Aircraft manufacturers of Iran
Manufacturing companies of Iran
Gas turbine manufacturers
Aircraft engine manufacturers of Iran
Aerospace companies of Iran
Engine manufacturers of Iran
Iranian entities subject to the U.S. Department of the Treasury sanctions